Chhattisgarh Division was an administrative division of the Central Provinces of British India. It was located in the east of the Central Provinces and encompassed the upper Mahanadi River basin, in the central part of present-day Chhattisgarh state of India.

With the advent of the British the town of Raipur, headquarters of Chhattisgarh Division, gained prominence over Ratanpur, the historical capital of the territory.
The Central Provinces became the Central Provinces and Berar in 1936 until the Independence of India.The major languages spoken are Chhattisgarhi, Odia, Hindi and numerous tribal languages.

History
Chhattisgarh Division was occupied by the Bhonsle Marathas and incorporated into the Kingdom of Nagpur in the 18th century. The Kingdom of Nagpur was annexed to British India in 1853, becoming Nagpur Province. In 1861 Nagpur Province was merged with the Saugor and Nerbudda Territories to form the Central Provinces. All the princely states of the Central Provinces were in Chhattisgarh Division, except for Makrai, which was in the Narmadapuram District of the Nerbudda Division.

In 1905, most of Odia speaking region of Sambalpur District and the princely states of Bamra, Rairakhol, Sonpur, Patna, and Kalahandi were transferred to Orissa Division of Bengal Province.

The princely states of Changbhakar, Korea, Surguja, Udaipur, and Jashpur were transferred from Bengal to the Central Provinces.

In 1933 the princely states in Chhattisgarh Division were transferred to the Eastern States Agency. On 24 October 1936, the Central Provinces became the Central Provinces and Berar when they were fully merged with Berar Province, although Berar remained under the nominal sovereignty of Hyderabad State.

Territory
The Chhattisgarh Division was bounded to the north by the Chota Nagpur States, to the east by the Orissa Tributary States, to the south by the princely states of Bastar and Kanker, and on the west by Nagpur and Jabalpur divisions, as well as the princely states of Kawardha, Khairagarh, and Nandgaon.

Districts
The division included the following three districts: 
Raipur
Bilaspur
Sambalpur

See also
Central Provinces, Administration

References

Divisions of British India
States and territories established in 1853
History of Chhattisgarh